Debbie Smith is a British guitar and bass player who has been in several bands from the 1990s to the present, including Curve, Echobelly, Nightnurse, Snowpony, Bows, Ye Nuns, SPC ECO and current bands Blindness and The London Dirthole Company.

Smith was interviewed for the 1995 book Never Mind the Bollocks: Women Rewrite Rock by Amy Raphael (published in the US as Grrrls: Viva Rock Divas).
She was also interviewed and quoted for the book Frock Rock: Women Performing Popular Music, a sociological study of women musicians in British popular music; at the time of the interview she was in Echobelly, and the book notes that Skin and Yolanda Charles both said that Smith was the only current black British female guitarist either one of them could think of.
Frock Rock says that "women like Skin, Natacha Atlas, Yolanda Charles, [reggae bassist] Mary Genis, and Debbie Smith are now acting as crucial role models for future generations of black women."

In 1997, Debbie Smith was the subject of the third episode of a TV series with the blanket title "A Woman Called Smith" (first broadcast on BBC2, 9 April 1997).

Smith is a lesbian and was interviewed in a 2021 documentary film by Harri Shanahan and Sian A Williams about her time in the feminist lesbian post-punk band Mouth Almighty (the documentary had its Channel 4 television premiere on 28 June 2022 as part of its Pride Season). She continues to perform as guitarist and DJ, and works at London music shop Intoxica! Records.

References

External links

Living people
Black British rock musicians
English bass guitarists
English women guitarists
Lesbian musicians
LGBT Black British people
English LGBT musicians
LGBT DJs
Musicians from London
Women bass guitarists
Year of birth missing (living people)